Salins is a commune in the Seine-et-Marne department in the Île-de-France region in north-central France. The 18th-century French playwright Charles-Georges Fenouillot de Falbaire de Quingey (1727–1800) was born in Salins.

Demographics
Inhabitants of Salins are called Salinois.

See also
 Communes of the Seine-et-Marne department

References

External links

 1999 Land Use, from IAURIF (Institute for Urban Planning and Development of the Paris-Île-de-France région) 
 

Communes of Seine-et-Marne